The Wadi Milk Formation is a geological formation in Sudan whose strata date back to the Late Cretaceous. Originally, the formation was thought to be Albian to Cenomanian, later research has provided dating to the Campanian to Maastrichtian. Dinosaur remains are among the fossils that have been recovered from the formation. It stretches from the lower Wadi Al-Malik across the Wadi Muqaddam into the Bayuda Desert.

Vertebrate paleofauna

Ornithischians

Saurischians

See also 
 List of dinosaur-bearing rock formations
 List of fossiliferous stratigraphic units in Sudan

References 

Geologic formations of Sudan
Upper Cretaceous Series of Africa
Campanian Stage
Maastrichtian Stage
Sandstone formations
Siltstone formations
Fluvial deposits
Lacustrine deposits
Fossiliferous stratigraphic units of Africa
Paleontology in Sudan